George Dacres (c. 1533–1580), of Cheshunt, Hertfordshire, was an English politician.

He was a Member (MP) of the Parliament of England for Castle Rising in 1571. He married Elizabeth Carew and they had two daughters. 

Their daughter Margaret married George Garrard, one of the sons of Sir William Garrard (Lord Mayor of London 1555-1556).

References

1533 births
1580 deaths
People from Cheshunt
English MPs 1571